General elections were held in the Faroe Islands on 19 January 2008, the latest possible date. The Self-Government Party and the Centre Party gained a seat each while  the Social Democratic Party lost a seat.

It had been considered to amend the election law to hold the election two weeks later to pass a number of important bills before the election, but in the end the negotiations on this failed and the election was called on 2007-12-07. Prior to this election, the electoral system was changed in 2007 from a system with seven multi-member constituencies, which had some elements of mixed member proportional voting, to a system with a single constituency for the whole country in order to reduce disproportionality.

Prior to the election, the Social Democratic Party formed a centrist unionist government with the People's Party and the Union Party. After the elections, four days of negotiations saw a centre-left separatist government emerge; while the Social Democratic Party retained the PM's post, the strongly pro-independence Republic got the majority of ministerial posts  (including the newly created post of foreign minister). The Centre Party also participated in the new government. Among the coalition agreement points was a plan to draft a constitution for the Faroe Islands, which would be approved in a referendum to be held in 2010.

The coalition broke up in mid-2008, however, and a government consisting of the parties governing before the 2008 election was sworn in on 26 September 2008, with Kaj Leo Johannesen as PM instead.

Results

See also
List of members of the Løgting, 2008–11

References

Faroes
2008 in the Faroe Islands
Elections in the Faroe Islands
January 2008 events in Europe